Syed Muhammad Fazal Agha (1946 – 20 May 2020) was a Pakistani politician from Pishin District of Balochistan province of Pakistan who served as Governor of Balochistan from 18 August to 12 October 1999. He also served as Deputy Chairman of the Senate of Pakistan from 1988-1991 from Balochistan. He was a member of the Provincial Assembly of Balochistan from 13 August 2018 till his death.

Life
Syed Fazal Agha was born in Killi Huramzai, Pishin District. He had political affiliation with Jamiat Ulema-e-Islam (F). He participated in the 2008 election and 2013 elections  but did not succeed. He was successful in the 2018 elections and was elected as member of Provincial Assembly of Balochistan for PB-20 (Pishin-III). He died on 20 May 2020 after contracting COVID-19 during the COVID-19 pandemic in Pakistan.

See also
 Governor of Baluchistan

References

2020 deaths
People from Pishin District
Governors of Balochistan, Pakistan
Balochistan MPAs 2018–2023
University of Balochistan alumni
1946 births
Deaths from the COVID-19 pandemic in Sindh
Deputy chairmen of the Senate of Pakistan